Donegal South-West was a parliamentary constituency represented in Dáil Éireann, the lower house of the Irish parliament or Oireachtas, from 1961 to 1969 and from 1981 to 2016. The constituency elected 3 deputies (Teachtaí Dála, commonly known as TDs). The method of election was proportional representation by means of the single transferable vote (PR-STV).

History and boundaries
The constituency was first created for the 1961 general election. At the 1969 general election it was abolished and largely replaced by the Donegal–Leitrim constituency. It was recreated for the 1981 general election. It was located in the southern and western parts of County Donegal, it included the towns of Lifford, Donegal, Ballyshannon, Killybegs and Gweedore. It was abolished again at the 2016 general election, and became part of the re-created Donegal constituency.

The Electoral (Amendment) Act 2009 defined the constituency as:

"The county of Donegal, except the part thereof which is comprised in the constituency of Donegal North-East."

TDs

TDs 1961–1969

TDs 1981–2016

Elections

2011 general election

2010 by-election
Following the resignation of Fianna Fáil TD Pat "the Cope" Gallagher on his election to the European Parliament in June 2009, a by-election was held on 25 November 2010. The seat was won by the Sinn Féin candidate Pearse Doherty.

2007 general election

2002 general election

1997 general election

1992 general election

1989 general election

1987 general election

1983 by-election
Following the death of Fianna Fáil TD Clement Coughlan, a by-election was held on 13 May 1983. The seat was won by the Fianna Fáil candidate Cathal Coughlan, brother of the deceased TD.

November 1982 general election

February 1982 general election

1981 general election

1965 general election

1961 general election

See also
Dáil constituencies
Politics of the Republic of Ireland
Historic Dáil constituencies
Elections in the Republic of Ireland

References

External links
Oireachtas Members Database

Dáil constituencies in the Republic of Ireland (historic)
Historic constituencies in County Donegal
1961 establishments in Ireland
1969 disestablishments in Ireland
Constituencies established in 1961
Constituencies disestablished in 1969
1981 establishments in Ireland
Constituencies established in 1981
2016 disestablishments in Ireland
Constituencies disestablished in 2016